Chatthin Wildlife Sanctuary is a protected area in Myanmar's Sagaing Region that was established in 1941, stretching over an area of . It is located in Kanbalu Township.

Fauna
Chatthin Wildlife Sanctuary provides habitat for Eld's deer. The Indochinese leopard was considered almost locally extinct by 2000.

References

External links

Protected areas of Myanmar
Protected areas established in 1941
Important Bird Areas of Myanmar